is the Japanese word for eyeglasses. It may refer to:

Megane (film), a film by Naoko Ogigami
Megane (Urusei Yatsura), an anime character
Megane Bridge, a bridge in Nagasaki, Nagasaki, Japan
Meganebashi, a bridge in Isahaya Park, Japan
Leila Megàne (1891–1960), a Welsh opera singer (born Margaret Jones)
Renault Mégane, a small family car produced by the French automaker Renault

See also
 Megan (disambiguation)